Complexe Desjardins  is a mixed-use office, hotel, and shopping mall complex located in Montreal, Quebec, Canada, in the Quartier des spectacles area of Saint Catherine Street. The project was designed to develop the eastern end of downtown Montreal, it is located in the quadrilateral formed by Saint Catherine, Saint-Urbain, Jeanne Mance and René Lévesque Boulevard.

Its architectural design consists of several towers housing offices of the Desjardins Group, Quebec Government offices and other companies, as well as a hotel, linked by an atrium shopping centre anchored by IGA. This design produces the effect of an indoor square. It is one of very few buildings in Canada to have its own postal code prefix, H5B.

The Complexe Desjardins is connected by the underground city to Place des Arts and the Place-des-Arts Metro station to the north, and the Complexe Guy-Favreau, the Palais des congrès de Montréal, and Place-d'Armes Metro station to the south.

The hotel in the complex opened as the Hotel Meridien Montreal in April 1976. It was later renamed the Wyndham Montreal, then the Hyatt Regency Montreal in 2003, then the DoubleTree by Hilton Montreal in December 2018.

Structures

Monument à Alphonse Desjardins

Yves Trudeau's Monument à Alphonse Desjardins was located outside at the corner of St. Urbain and St. Catherine from 1975 to 1995 but since relocated to Parc Catchpaw, in Orford, Quebec.

See also
 List of shopping malls in Montreal
 List of tallest buildings in Montreal

References

Further reading

External links
 Official website

 

Bank headquarters in Canada
Office buildings completed in 1976
Darling and Pearson buildings
Shopping malls in Montreal
Skyscrapers in Montreal
Downtown Montreal
1976 establishments in Quebec
Desjardins Group
Skyscraper office buildings in Canada
Quartier des spectacles